Isaac Carpenter or Ike Carpenter may refer to:

Isaac Carpenter (drummer) (born 1979), American drummer, percussionist, producer, audio engineer and session musician
Isaac M. "Ike" Carpenter (1920–1998), American jazz bandleader and pianist
Isaac W. Carpenter Jr. (1893–1983), American businessman and Assistant Secretary of State for Administration
Isaac Carpenter (Canadian politician) (1849–1933), Canadian politician in the Legislative Assembly of New Brunswick